Lycoperdon curtisii is a type of puffball mushroom in the genus Lycoperdon. It was first described scientifically in 1859 by Miles Joseph Berkeley. Vascellum curtisii, published by Hanns Kreisel in 1963, is a synonym. Its fruit bodies (puffballs) have been recorded growing in fairy rings. It is nonpoisonous.

References

External links

Fungi found in fairy rings
Puffballs
Fungi described in 1859
Taxa named by Miles Joseph Berkeley
curtisii